Kūdra Station is a railway station on the Torņakalns – Tukums II Railway in Latvia in the Kūdra neighbourhood of Jūrmala, Latvia.

References

External links 

Railway stations in Latvia
Railway stations opened in 1951